This is a list of adult fiction books that topped The New York Times Fiction Best Seller list in 1938. When the list began in 1931 through 1941 it only reflected sales in the New York City area.

The two most popular books that year were The Citadel, by A. J. Cronin, which held on top of the list for 16 weeks, and The Yearling by Marjorie Kinnan Rawlings, which was on top of the list for 12 weeks.

See also

 1938 in literature
 Lists of The New York Times Fiction Best Sellers
 Publishers Weekly list of bestselling novels in the United States in the 1930s

References

1938
.
1938 in the United States